The brown parrotbill (Cholornis unicolor) is a parrotbill found in the central and eastern Himalayas. It is also known as the brown suthora. A dark stripe runs above the eyes and along the sides of the crown. The bird moves in small groups and will sometimes join mixed species foraging flocks. It is found in Bhutan, China, India, Myanmar, and Nepal.

Originally described by Brian Houghton Hodgson in the genus Hemirhynchus, this species was later moved to the genus Heteromorpha. It is now usually treated as a member of the family Paradoxornithidae, where its closest relative is the three-toed parrotbill. Subspecies canaster, described by Thayer and Bangs in 1912 from Hsikang, and saturatior, described by Rothschild in 1921 from Yunnan, are generally not considered valid.

Gallery

References

Robson, C. (2007). Family Paradoxornithidae (Parrotbills) pp. 292 – 321   in; del Hoyo, J., Elliott, A. & Christie, D.A. eds. Handbook of the Birds of the World, Vol. 12. Picathartes to Tits and Chickadees. Lynx Edicions, Barcelona.

brown parrotbill
brown parrotbill
Birds of Nepal
Birds of Bhutan
Birds of China
Birds of Yunnan
brown parrotbill
brown parrotbill
Taxonomy articles created by Polbot